Index-based insurance, also known as index-linked insurance or, simply, index insurance, is primarily used in agriculture. Because of the high cost of assessing losses, traditional insurance based on paying indemnities for actual losses incurred is usually not viable, particularly for smallholders in developing countries. With index-based insurance, payouts are related to an “index” that is closely correlated to agricultural production losses, such as one based on rainfall, yield or vegetation levels (e.g. pasture for livestock). Payouts are made when the index exceeds a certain threshold, often referred to as a “trigger”. Index-based insurance is not therefore designed to protect farmers against every peril, but only where there is a widespread risk that significantly influences a farmer’s livelihood. Many such indices now make use of satellite imagery.

Justification for index-based insurance
Insuring risk in small-scale agriculture faces particular problems that are not usually encountered by the broader insurance sector. Production relies on natural conditions, such as rain, temperature, and sunlight, which cannot be controlled easily by poorer farmers, other than by those with access to irrigation or plastic tunnels in the case of horticultural crops. Consequently farmers face problems on a regular basis. Unlike other insurance, adverse events cannot easily be predicted statistically, large numbers of people tend to be affected at the same time (known as "covariance" by the insurance industry) and losses for each of them tend to be significant. The opposite is the case for more traditional insurance such as home theft insurance, where actuaries can make a good forecast of the likely incidence of claims, thefts are (relatively) rare, all the houses on a block are not entered at the same time, and entire contents of a house are not usually stolen.

Traditional insurance has two cost categories. First is the underlying risk that is being insured and, second, the costs involved in operating the insurance, such as carrying out individual risk assessments and loss adjustments. In the agricultural sector these costs tend to be high and premiums are often unaffordable for most poorer farmers. The fixed costs of loss verification make it uneconomic to investigate losses for small-scale agriculture producers whose total insurance premium are small. In practice, this can lead to poor loss verification, morally hazardous behavior and high loss ratios for insurance companies.

In theory, index-based insurance can cover many farmers while avoiding the need for loss assessment and adjustment. This can reduce some administrative and implementation costs, and also has the potential to limit payouts caused by fraud or poor farming practices.

Index-based insurance in practice
There are considerable challenges that must be overcome to effectively service farmers in remote areas. The lack of historical rainfall data, yield data, or information on livestock mortality has complicated the development of indices, while the small size of farms, low value of crops or animals to be insured, and high costs of operation have made it difficult to design a workable scheme. Offsetting that, ICTs, particularly smartphones, are reducing costs, while increasing use of satellite measurements for the purposes of index development has also been effective.

Index-based insurance does not always provide farmers with indemnities when they experience crop or animal losses and the indemnity payments sometimes do not accurately reflect the size of the losses they experience. This is because an index is based on a geographical area within which farmers may have different experiences with, e.g., rainfall. As a consequence some farmers may achieve a good crop when most others in the area experience a crop failure. However, under an index-based system all farmers receive payouts. This problem has become known as "basis risk". As a direct consequence of basis risk, farmers are usually reluctant to pay the same premiums for index-based insurance than they would for standard insurance. Reducing basis risk by incorporating newly upcoming data sources is of central interest in current research.

Issues to address
Experience to date in developing countries has been that index-based insurance requires subsidies in order to be commercially viable. Subsidies usually take one of two forms: governments may support the establishment of insurance programmes through provision of data necessary to calculate indices and through assistance with promotion and training, or they may provide direct support, often by subsidising premium payments. The question that needs to be addressed is whether such subsidies represent a good use of scarce national resources. A second important issue concerns who will be insured under index-based insurance contracts. Perhaps surprisingly, farmers may not be the most obvious choice. The use of index insurance by financial institutions and farm input suppliers who extend credit to low income farmers in developing countries may be a more cost-effective use and enable such bulk buyers of insurance to hedge against default by farmers and thus continue to deal with those who have a high risk of defaulting.

See also

 Crop insurance
 Microinsurance
 Parametric insurance

References

Agricultural insurance
Crops
Livestock
Agricultural economics